Pilla Nuvvu Leni Jeevitam ( Girl, Life Without You) is a 2014 Telugu romantic action comedy film directed by A.S. Ravi Kumar Chowdary, jointly produced by Bunny Vasu and Harishith on Geetha Arts and Sri Venkateswara Creations banner. Starring Sai Dharam Tej, Regina Cassandra, Jagapathi Babu  and music was composed by Anoop Rubens. The film is the first release of Sai Dharam Tej as the lead actor. The title was taken from a song of the film Gabbar Singh. The film opened to positive to mixed reviews from critics and was a hit at the box office.

Sai Dharam Tej's debut was Rey, produced and directed, by YVS Chowdary on his Bommarillu films banner. The film was launched at Ramanaidu Studios in Hyderabad on 17 October 2010 on the eve of Vijayadasami. The filming ended on 6 August 2013. Rey has been delayed due to financial issues and it was released on 27 March 2015. Sai Dharam Tej won SIIMA Award for Best Male Debut (Telugu) at 4th SIIMA and Best Debut Actor Award at the 13th Santosham Film Awards.

Plot
The story begins with a notorious politician Ganga Prasad (Sayaji Shinde), and a clean politician Prabhakar (Prakash Raj), vying for the CM's seat. An investigative journalist Shafi (Shafi), breaks a story on Ganga Prasad and reveals that he has some important information on the candidate aspiring to the next CM. In comes Maisamma (Jagapati Babu), a contract killer, who is assigned the task of finishing off Shafi by the SP (Ahuti Prasad). Once he is done with Shafi, Maisamma is given another photograph as the next contract. Meanwhile, it is time for the hero's debut, and he enters Srinu (Sai Dharam Tej) from Palakollu. He finds his way to Maisamma through Yadigiri (Raghu Babu) to seek his help to get rid of a person. Of course, Maisamma is not convinced and refuses to take up the task. That's when Srinu narrates how he fell in love with Shailaja (Regina Cassandra) and why he wants Maisamma to finish off a man. The scene shifts to an engineering college where both Srinu and Shailu are students, and from here on, the story takes a few surprise twists and turns. There ends the story. This movie kickstarted Tej's career, and hits like Solo Brathuke So Better and Prati Roju Pandage followed.

Cast 

 Sai Dharam Tej as Srinu
 Regina Cassandra as Shailaja (Shailu) / Sirisha (Siri)
 Jagapathi Babu as Maisamma
 Prakash Raj as Prabhakar
 Sayaji Shinde as Ganga Prasad
 Chandra Mohan as Chandra Mohan
 Raghu Babu as Yadigiri
 Prabhakar as Maisamma's henchman
 Ahuti Prasad as S.P.
 Jaya Prakash Reddy as J.P.
 Surya as orphanage manager
 Vizag Prasad as  M.L.A.
 Shankar Melkote as Principal
 Shafi as Shafi (Investigation Journalist)
 Prudhvi Raj as M.L.A.
 Prabhu as the police inspector
 Prabhas Sreenu as Delhi
 Venu Gopal as Maisamma's henchman
 Satyam Rajesh
 Thagubothu Ramesh
 Ambati Srinivas
 Kishore Das as anchor
 Duvvasi Mohan as movier
 Gundu Sudharshan as Prabhakar's assistant
 Hema as Hema
 Surekha Vani as Surekha
 Rajitha as Chandra Mohan's wife
 Y. Kasi Viswanath as Hema's husband
 Satya Krishnan as Satya
 Priya as Parvati
 Suresh as G. Suresh
 Subhashini as a hostel warden

Soundtrack 

Music composed by Anup Rubens. The soundtrack of the film was released worldwide on 25 October 2014 on Aditya Music Company.

Reception 
The satellite rights of the film were acquired by MAA TV. The film opened to mixed reviews.

Box office
The film opened good response all over the world by collecting (Share) on its first day. The film collected  (Share)
in its first week. The film ended by collecting  worldwide.

References

External links 
 

2014 films
2014 masala films
2014 romantic comedy films
Indian romantic comedy films
Indian romantic action films
2010s Telugu-language films
Indian action thriller films
2010s romantic action films
2014 action thriller films
Sri Venkateswara Creations films